Amphidium may refer to:
 Amphidium (plant), a genus of mosses in the family Rhabdoweisiaceae
 Amphidium (protist), a genus of protists in the family Gymnodiniaceae
 Amphidium, a genus of fungi in the family Collemataceae; synonym of Leptogium